Koh Juat Jong  is a Singaporean judge who served as Solicitor-General of Singapore between 2008 and 2014.

Early life
Koh attended CHIJ Saint Nicholas Girls' School and National Junior College, and was named a President's Scholar in 1978. She graduated with a Bachelor of Science in economics and statistics from University College London in 1981. She then joined the Administrative Service. She obtained her Bachelor of Laws from the National University of Singapore Faculty of Law in 1988 and her Master of Laws from Harvard Law School in 1989.

Career
Between 1981 and 1986, Koh joined the Administrative Service and served in the Ministry of Finance dealing with tax policies and personnel policies.

Koh joined the Attorney-General's Chambers as a State Counsel before being posted to the Supreme Court as a Senior Assistant Registrar. In 1995, she was appointed a District Judge and subsequently became the Principal District Judge, Family and Juvenile Justice Division. In 2003, she became Registrar of the Supreme Court; five years later, she was appointed the first female Solicitor-General in 2008. She was Acting Attorney-General for five months in 2010 during a leadership transition.

Koh was awarded the Public Administration Medal (Gold) during the National Day Awards in 2005 and the Public Administration Medal (Gold) (Bar) during the National Day Awards in 2011. She retired from her appointment of Solicitor General on 31 Jan 2014.

References

External links
Koh Juat Jong's profile on the Singapore Attorney-General's Chambers website

President's Scholars
Singaporean Senior Counsel
Singaporean people of Chinese descent
Living people
National University of Singapore alumni
Harvard Law School alumni
CHIJ Saint Nicholas Girls' School alumni
Recipients of the Pingat Pentadbiran Awam
Year of birth missing (living people)